Technological University (Myeik) is situated on the side of the Yangon-Myeik road and is about 10     7.87 acres wide, at the village of Kabin, in the township of Myeik, Taninthayi Region, Myanmar. It was formerly opened as Government Technological Institute (GTI) on 27 October 1999 and then it has been promoted to Government Technological College (GTC) in January 2002. Finally, it has been promoted again to university level in January 2007. Technological University (Myeik) has produced human resources annually. Degrees provided by the university are Graduate Degree Program, Under Graduate Degree Program. The library in Technological University (Myeik) has up to date books and CDs for the students.

Departments
Civil Engineering Department
Electronic Communication Department
Electrical Power Department
Mechanical Department
Literature Department (Myanmar, English)
Chemistry Department
Physics Department
Mathematics Department
Technological university(myeik)Students' Union
Technological university(myeik)Teachers' Union

Programs

See also
list of universities in Burma

References

Technological universities in Myanmar